Sophie Cliff is a conspicuous granite cliff at the east side of the entrance to Piccard Cove, Wilhelmina Bay, on the west coast of Graham Land. First charted and named by the Belgian Antarctic Expedition under Gerlache in 1898.

Cliffs of Graham Land
Danco Coast